The Paratech P43 is a Swiss single-place paraglider that was designed by Uwe Bernholz and produced by Paratech of Appenzell. It was introduced in 2003, but is now out of production.

Design and development
The aircraft was designed as an intermediate glider.

The wing design includes "Permanent Air Flow", a feature by which the cell openings are made smaller to improve the leading edge profile.

Variants
P43XS
Extra small-sized model for lighter pilots. The glider model is DHV 1-2 certified.
P43S
Small-sized model for lighter pilots. The glider model is DHV 1-2 certified.
P43M
Mid-sized model for medium-weight pilots. The glider model is DHV 1-2 certified.
P43L
Large-sized model for heavier pilots. The glider model is DHV 1-2 certified.

Specifications (P43M)

References

P43
Paragliders
Vehicles introduced in 2003